Scott Township is one of eleven townships in Montgomery County, Indiana, United States. As of the 2010 census, its population was 837 and it contained 356 housing units.

History
Ashby was listed on the National Register of Historic Places in 1980.

Geography

Cities, towns, villages
 New Market (southeast corner)

Unincorporated towns
 Lapland at 
 Parkersburg at

Cemeteries
The township contains these three cemeteries: James, Old Pottinger and Wasson.

Major highways
  U.S. Route 231

School districts
 South Montgomery Community School Corporation

Political districts
 Indiana's 4th congressional district
 State House District 28
 State House District 41
 State Senate District 23

References
 
 United States Census Bureau 2008 TIGER/Line Shapefiles
 IndianaMap

External links
 Indiana Township Association
 United Township Association of Indiana
 City-Data.com page for Scott Township

Townships in Montgomery County, Indiana
Townships in Indiana